The Sudiți (plural of Sudit - Romanian language, from Italian , meaning "subject" or "citizen") were inhabitants of the Danubian Principalities (Wallachia and Moldavia) who, for the latter stage of the 18th and a large part of the 19th century — during and after the Phanariote period of rule, were placed under the protection of foreign states (usually the Habsburg monarchy, Imperial Russia, and France) as reward for particular services or in exchange for payment.

Rights acquired included immunity from prosecution in front of both local rulers (hospodars) and the Principalities' suzerain power, the Ottoman Empire, as well as tax exemptions; the competing interests of nations involved allowed consuls to traffic sudiți favours and titles.

History
The category was established by the 1774 Treaty of Küçük Kaynarca, which led to the creation of foreign consulates in Iași and Bucharest.

An expanding and powerful social category during the Russo-Turkish wars (which affected the Principalities' soil), many sudiți were wholesale businessmen who formed guilds (bresle or isnafuri) and successfully competed with Romanians in several fields (after the Treaty of Adrianople in 1829 allowed the two countries to engage in foreign trade), expanding during the period of Russian administration (1828-1857).

Notable sudiți included Tudor Vladimirescu and Dimitrie Macedonski, leaders of the 1821 Wallachian uprising, as well as Ashkenazi Jews who had left various regions in Russia and the Austrian-ruled Kingdom of Galicia and Lodomeria.

The category disappeared after the 1878 Romanian War of Independence.

See also
History of Bucharest
History of the Jews in Romania

References
Paul Cernovodeanu, "Evreii în epoca fanariotă", in Magazin Istoric, March 1997, p. 25-28
Neagu Djuvara, Între Orient și Occident. Țările române la începutul epocii moderne, Humanitas, Bucharest, 1995, p. 184-187
Constantin C. Giurescu, Istoria Bucureștilor. Din cele mai vechi timpuri pînă în zilele noastre, Ed. Pentru Literatură, Bucharest, 1966, p. 114, 115, 288
 Nicolae Iorga,  Histoire des relations entre la France et les Roumains: La Monarchie de juillet et les Roumains (details on French consuls and their Jewish protégés)

1774 establishments in Europe
1878 disestablishments in Europe
18th-century establishments in Romania
Human migration
Jewish Romanian history
History of nationality
History of Moldavia
Romanian words and phrases
History of Wallachia